Yuri Mikhailovich Gusakov (born 16 April 1969) is a Russian professional football official and a former player. He works as an administrator with FC Zenit St. Petersburg.

Playing career
He made his professional debut in the Soviet Second League in 1989 for FC Spartak Kostroma. He played 1 game and scored 1 goal in the UEFA Cup 1994–95 for FC Tekstilshchik Kamyshin.

References

1969 births
Footballers from Moscow
Living people
Soviet footballers
Russian footballers
Association football midfielders
Russian Premier League players
FC Tyumen players
FC Zenit Saint Petersburg players
Wormatia Worms players
FC Tekstilshchik Kamyshin players
Russian expatriate footballers
Expatriate footballers in Germany
FC Spartak Kostroma players
FC Zenit-2 Saint Petersburg players